Zemu may refer to:

Zemu Gap Peak, in the Himalayas
Zemu Glacier, in the Himalayas

See also
Zemus, a character of the Final Fantasy IV series
Xemu (disambiguation)